São Caetano do Sul–Prefeito Walter Braido, unofficially called only as São Caetano or São Caetano do Sul, is a train station on CPTM Line 10-Turquoise.

The station is located in the center of the city of São Caetano do Sul, in the ABC Region.

In January 2015, the then-called São Caetano station was renamed to São Caetano do Sul-Prefeito Walter Braido.

References

Companhia Paulista de Trens Metropolitanos stations
Railway stations opened in 1883
Railway stations opened in 1973